Mohd Nurul Azwan Roya (born 25 June 1986) is a Malaysian footballer who plays as a midfielder. He is also known as Awe by his teammate since his time with Johor FC

Career

Johor FC
Nurul Azwan Roya was born in Pasir Puteh, Kelantan. He attended a local school and started playing for the Kelantan FA President's Cup Team at the age of 20. He was promoted to play for the Johor senior team in 2005.

Kelantan
After a long season with Johor FC, he joined Kelantan FA. He achieved a lot of success with Kelantan FA, especially in the 2012 season after helping his team complete the treble by winning the Malaysia Cup 2012. He also represented Kelantan in the 2012 AFC Cup.

Return to Johor FC
Azwan left Kelantan FA after one season to return to Johor for the 2013 Malaysia Super League. On 2 March 2013, he scored his first goal for the club in a 2–1 defeat of Negeri Sembilan FA. Being a key player of 2013's Johor, he managed to make 7 assist and 4 goals for that season.

PDRM FA
After failing to cement his spot at Johor Darul Ta'zim F.C., he signed with PDRM FA in 2015. However, during the mid season, PDRM FA terminated his contract along with Muslim Ahmad after they did not perform well while playing for the PDRM FA.

Return to Kelantan
He returned to Kelantan for the 2017 season, but was released at the end of the season.

International career
Nurul Azwan Roya was called up to represent national Under-19 team for trials in 2004.

Honours
Johor Darul Takzim
 Malaysia Super League: 2014

Kelantan FA
 Malaysia Cup: 2012
 Malaysia Super League: 2012
 Malaysia FA Cup: 2012

References

External links
 Profile - Nurul Azwan Roya
 Nurul Azwan Roya Kelantan
 Profile

1986 births
Living people
Malaysian footballers
Kelantan FA players
Johor Darul Ta'zim F.C. players
People from Kelantan
Malaysian people of Malay descent
Association football wingers